Hoseyn Mameh (also Romanized as Hoseyn Māmeh; also known as Ḩoseyn Māheh) is a village in Akhtachi-ye Mahali Rural District, Simmineh District, Bukan County, West Azerbaijan Province, Iran. At the 2006 census, its population was 702, in 130 families.

References 

Populated places in Bukan County